Muhammad Sadik Muhammad Yusuf (15 April 1952 - 10 March 2015) was an Uzbekistani Muslim scholar born in the region of Andijan.

Life
He was the son of Muhammad-Yusuf (who died in 2004), who was the son of Muhammad-Ali, a scholar from Andijan. He was the mufti of the Spiritual Administration of the Muslims of Central Asia and Kazakhstan. He was Uzbekistan’s first mufti after independence.

Muhammad Sodiq was a member of the International Union of Muslim Scholars (IUMS), a non-governmental organization of Islamic scholars.

Biography
Muhammad Sodiq received his primary religious education from his father. After finishing middle school in 1970, he attended the Mir-i Arab madrassa in Bukhara. 

He then studied at the Tashkent Islamic Institute in Tashkent, finishing with distinction in 1975. He then edited the journal, Muslims of the east of the Soviet Union.

In 1976, Muhammad Sodiq was admitted to ad-Dawa al-Islami National Islamic University in Libya, which he finished with distinction and a financial award. This period of study exposed him to a future generation of Muslim imams, mostly from the Arabic world but even reaching to places as far away as Japan.

Muhammad Sodiq was elected mufti by the SADUM in March 1989, and in the same year he was elected as a deputy to the Supreme Soviet of the USSR. Sheikh presented a report to the former Soviet Union President Mikhail Gorbachev explaining the problems of Muslims rights in the protocol. He asked to return Muslims their rights to pray, to learn the religion. 

In Muhammad Sodiq’s meeting with Gorbachev, positive changes have been seen in the policy towards the religion in the communist regime. With Muhammad Sodiq’s efforts, numerous mosques and madrassas were built in the Soviet Union. The Muslims were allowed to follow their religious traditions and ceremonies. 

In 1997 Muhammad Sodiq was put in charge of Muslim countries and federations of the Commonwealth of Independent States within Rabita al-Alam al-Islami (Muslim World League), an international Islamic organization in Saudi Arabia. He was a permanent member of the governing council of this organization.

Death

Muhammad Sodiq died on 10 March 2015 after suffering a heart attack.

Writings
From 1994 to 2000 he published approximately thirty popular articles and twenty-five books and pamphlets. Most were written in Uzbek, and some were translated into Russian. The main publisher was the Kara Su branch of the press of the Islamic cultural center in Osh.

His books include: Tafsiri Hilal (Translation and interpretation of the meanings of the Glorious Qur'an, in 6 volumes), Hadith wa Hayot (Hadith and life, series of books talking about the history and all details of Islam systematically in details, history of all prophets.., around in 40 volumes.), Ruhiy tarbiya (Spiritual attitude development/education, 3 volumes), Kifoya (books on fiqh (Islamic law) 3 volumes), and many other books, booklets, audio and video materials in Islam and translations of Imaam Al Buhariy's famous books into Uzbek language. 

In his books since 2002 he included the following credo at the beginning, in the style of an Islamic movement that is seeking to transcend the divisions within the faith:

References

1952 births
2015 deaths
20th-century Muslim scholars of Islam
People from Andijan Region
Hanafis
Maturidis
Grand Muftis of Uzbekistan
Soviet muftis
Members of the Congress of People's Deputies of the Soviet Union
Members of the Supreme Soviet of the Soviet Union